North Glen Ellyn is an unincorporated community in Milton Township, DuPage County, Illinois, United States.

Notes

Unincorporated communities in DuPage County, Illinois
Unincorporated communities in Illinois